Joseph Merrill Harper (June 21, 1787January 15, 1865) was an American physician, banker and Jacksonian politician in the U.S. state of New Hampshire. He served as a member of the United States House of Representatives, the New Hampshire State Senate and the New Hampshire House of Representatives and was acting governor of New Hampshire.

Early life and career
Harper was born in Limerick (in modern-day Maine, then a part of Massachusetts) and attended Fryeburg Academy. He studied medicine and began the practice of medicine in Sanbornton, New Hampshire, in 1810. In 1811, he moved to Canterbury, New Hampshire, to continue his practice. He served as assistant surgeon in the 4th Infantry in the War of 1812. After the war he returned to his medical practice, and was elected a Fellow of the New Hampshire Medical Society in 1821.

Political career
He was a member of the New Hampshire House of Representatives in 1826 and 1827, and justice of the peace in Canterbury from 1826–1865. Harper served in the New Hampshire State Senate in 1829 and 1830, and was president of the State Senate in 1831. He became Acting Governor of New Hampshire in February 1831 when Governor Matthew Harvey resigned as governor in order to accept a position as a United States federal judge. Harper served as Acting Governor from February 1831 – June 1831.

Harper was elected as a Jacksonian candidate to the Twenty Second and Twenty Third Congresses, serving as a U.S. Representative from March 4, 1831 – March 3, 1835.

After leaving Congress, he resumed the practice of medicine. He was justice of the peace from 1835–1865 and president of the Mechanics Bank of Concord from 1847–1856.

Harper died on January 15, 1865, in Canterbury, and is interred in the Village Cemetery.

Personal life
Harper married Elizabeth Clough on June 6, 1816. They had two sons and a daughter.

References

External links

National Governors Association profile

1787 births
1865 deaths
People from Limerick, Maine
Physicians from New Hampshire
People from Sanbornton, New Hampshire
People from Canterbury, New Hampshire
United States Army personnel of the War of 1812
Democratic Party members of the New Hampshire House of Representatives
Democratic Party New Hampshire state senators
Democratic Party governors of New Hampshire
Presidents of the New Hampshire Senate
Jacksonian members of the United States House of Representatives from New Hampshire
19th-century American politicians
Fryeburg Academy alumni